Angelos Spiropoulos (born 15 June 1979 in Athens) is a Greek sport shooter. He was selected as one of eleven shooters to represent the host nation Greece at the 2004 Summer Olympics in Athens, and eventually won a silver medal in double trap shooting at the 2005 European Championships in Belgrade, Serbia and Montenegro. Spiropoulos is a member of the shooting team for Panellinios Gymnastikos Syllogos in his native Athens, where he trains throughout his sport career under coach Tom Alderin.

Spiropoulos was named as part of the Greek shooting team to compete in the men's double trap at the 2004 Summer Olympics in Athens by having achieved one of the Olympic places reserved to the host nation for his event. A less experienced to the international scene, Spiropoulos showed off his best to eagerly shoot 124 hits out of 150 in the qualifying round, which was worthily enough to attain a twenty-second position from a field of twenty-five shooters.

References

External links

Olympic Profile – In.gr

1979 births
Living people
Greek male sport shooters
Olympic shooters of Greece
Shooters at the 2004 Summer Olympics
Sportspeople from Athens